The National Association of Schools of Music (NASM) is an association of post-secondary music schools in the United States and the principal U.S. accreditor for higher education in music.  It was founded on October 20, 1924, and is based in Reston, Virginia. Accreditation commenced in 1939.

Accreditation 
NASM is recognized by the Council for Higher Education Accreditation as a programmatic accreditation organization for institutions offering degree and non-degree educational programs in music and music-related disciplines. It currently has approximately 625 accredited institutional members, including specialty schools of music, conservatories, and universities offering music programs.

History 
Leaders from six music schools met on June 10, 1924, to organize the inaugural convention of the "National Association of Schools of Music and Allied Arts" to be held on October 20, 1924, in Pittsburgh.  The founding leaders were:

 Burnet Corwin Tuthill (1888–1982), Cincinnati Conservatory of Music
 John James Hattstaedt (1851–1931), American Conservatory of Music (1886–1991)
 Kenneth McPherson Bradley (1872–1954), Bush Conservatory of Music, which merged in 1932 with The Chicago Conservatory College under duress of the Great Depression
 Arthur Wright Mason (1866–1955), Louisville Conservatory of Music, which merged in 1932 with the University of Louisville under duress of the Great Depression
 Charles Newell Boyd (1875–1937), Pittsburgh Musical Institute, which merged in 1963 with the University of Pittsburgh
 Edwin John Stringham (1890–1974), Wolcott Conservatory of Music, founded in 1920 and in 1925 was reorganized and renamed as the Denver College of Music

The attendees at the first NASM Convention of October 20, 1924, decided to officially form the "National Association of Schools of Music and Allied Arts."  The accreditation aspect of NASM, though, did not launch until about 1929.  The charter members currently in existence are:

 The Music Conservatory of Chicago College of Performing Arts
 Cleveland Institute of Music
 Converse College, Spartanburg, South Carolina
 Eastman School of Music, University of Rochester
 New England Conservatory of Music, Boston
 Northwestern University, Evanston, Illinois
 Oberlin College
 Syracuse University
 University of Cincinnati
 University of Iowa, Iowa City
 University of Kansas, Lawrence
 University of Michigan
 University of Nebraska, Lincoln
 University of Oregon
 University of the Pacific, Stockton, California
 University of Southern California
 Wisconsin Conservatory of Music, Milwaukee
 Yale University

NASM's founding officers were Kenneth M. Bradley, President; Burnet C. Tuthill, Secretary; and Charles N. Boyd, Treasurer.

Current and past presidents 
 1924–1928 — Kenneth McPherson Bradley (1872–1954), Bush Conservatory of Music
 1928–1931 — Harold Lancaster Butler (1874–1957), Syracuse University, University of Kansas
 1932–1935 — Earl Vincent Moore (1890–1987), University of Michigan
 1935–1944 — Howard Harold Hanson (1996–1981), Eastman School of Music
 1944–1948 — Donald Malcolm Swarthout (1894–1962), University of Kansas
 1948–1952 — Price Asher Doyle (1896–1967), Murray State University
 1953–1962 — Thomas Artur Gorton, PhD (1910–1997), University of Kansas (served 4 terms as president)
 1955–1958 — Erza William Doty PhD (1907–1994), University of Texas at Austin
 1962–19?? — Charles Brownlow Hunt, Jr. (1916–2002), Peabody College
 1968 - Robert Hargreaves, Ball State University
 1971–1972 — Carl Melvin Neumeyer (1911–1972), Illinois Wesleyan University
 1976–1978 — Warner Imig (1910–2005), University of Colorado at Boulder
 1983–1985 — Thomas W. Miller, Northwestern University
 1986–1988 — Robert Burr Glidden (born 1936), Florida State University
 1989–1991 — Robert J. Werner, University of Cincinnati – College-Conservatory of Music
 1992-1994 — Fred Miller DePaul University
 1995–1997 — Harold M. Best, (born 1931), Wheaton College, Illinois
 1998–2000 — J. William Hipp (born 1934), University of Miami School of Music
 2001–2003 — David J. Tomatz, PhD (1935–2014), University of Houston
 2004–2006 — Karen Lias Wolff, University of Michigan, Oberlin Conservatory of Music
 2007–2009 — Daniel Sher, University of Colorado at Boulder
 2010–2012 — Donald Gibson, Florida State University
 2013–2015 — Mark Wait, Vanderbilt University
 2016–2018 — Sue Haug, Pennsylvania State University
 2019-2021 — Robert Earl Bays (born 1921)

See also 
 List of recognized accreditation associations of higher learning
 United States Department of Education
 European Association of Conservatoires (AEC)
 National Association for Music in Higher Education, United Kingdom of Great Britain and Northern Ireland

References
General references
 Carl Melvin Neumeyer (1911–1972), "The History of the National Association of Schools of Music," Doctor of Music Education dissertation, Indiana University, Bloomington (1954) 
 Carl Melvin Neumeyer (editor) (1911-1972), By-laws and regulations, National Association of Schools of Music (1965) 
 Bulletin of the National Association of Schools of Music   
 Burnet Corwin Tuthill (1888–1982), NASM, the first forty years; a personal history of the National Association of Schools of Music, National Association of Schools of Music (1973)  
 Sheila A. Barrows (born 1931) (compiler & editor), Historical Perspectives, 1924-1999: National Association of Schools of Music, Seventy-Fifth Anniversary, National Association of Schools of Music (1999)   
Inline citations

External links
 National Association of Schools of Music– Official website

College and university associations and consortia in the United States
School accreditors
Music education organizations
Music education in the United States
Educational organizations based in the United States
Arts organizations established in 1924
1924 establishments in the United States